Leurocycloceras is an extinct genus of actively mobile carnivorous cephalopod, essentially a Nautiloid, that lived in what would be North America, Europe, and Asia during the Silurian from 443.7—418.7 mya, existing for approximately .

Taxonomy
Leurocycloceras was assigned to Orthocerida by Sepkoski (2002).

Morphology
The shell is usually long, and may be straight ("orthoconic") or gently curved.  In life, these animals may have been similar to the modern squid, except for the long shell.

Fossil distribution
Fossil distribution is exclusive to Great Britain, Wisconsin USA, and northern Ontario, Canada.

References

Prehistoric nautiloid genera
Silurian cephalopods of North America
Silurian extinctions
Prehistoric animals of Europe
Paleozoic life of Ontario